The Minister of Foreign Affairs of Iran is the head of the Ministry of Foreign Affairs of Iran and a member of the Cabinet. The current office holder is Hossein Amir-Abdollahian, being approved by the Parliament on 25 August 2021 after being nominated by the President.

List of ministers

Qajar Iran

Pahlavi Iran

Islamic Republic of Iran

See also 
 Ministry of Foreign Affairs
 Cabinet of Iran

External links 
 

 
Iran
Government ministers of Iran
Foreign relations of Iran